Armando Merodio Pesquera (23 August 1935 – 21 June 2018) was a Spanish footballer who played as a striker.

Football career
Born in Barcelona, Catalonia, where his father (known as 'Txikito Gallarta') was a pelota player, Merodio's family moved back to the Basque Country when he was three years old. He started his professional career with Barakaldo CF but soon signed with Athletic Bilbao, being eligible to represent the club due to learning his football skills in the territory.

Merodio made his La Liga debut on 11 March 1956, scoring in a 2–1 home win against Atlético Madrid. His input during the season, however, was restricted to a further two games as the team won the league and also the Copa del Rey; on 16 January 1957, in the subsequent edition of the European Cup, he found the net in a 5–3 defeat of Manchester United in the quarter-finals' first leg, losing 5–6 on aggregate.

During the 1958–59 campaign, Merodio scored 11 times over four consecutive league games (Athletic won 9–0, 9–0, 8–1 and 7–0). He eventually left the club in 1963 with 104 official appearances and 39 goals, joining Real Murcia also in the top division, playing there for two seasons and suffering relegation in his second.

Merodio closed out his career in 1967 at nearly 32, after one-year spells in the second level with Recreativo de Huelva and SD Indautxu, the latter also in the Basque region. He died on 21 June 2018 in Bilbao, aged 82.

Honours
Athletic Bilbao
La Liga: 1955–56
Copa del Generalísimo: 1956, 1958

References

External links

1935 births
2018 deaths
Footballers from Barcelona
Spanish footballers
Footballers from the Basque Country (autonomous community)
Association football forwards
La Liga players
Segunda División players
CD Getxo players
Barakaldo CF footballers
Athletic Bilbao footballers
Real Murcia players
Recreativo de Huelva players
SD Indautxu footballers
Spain youth international footballers